Spring Hill (preliminary names Tysons West, Tysons–Spring Hill Road) is a Washington Metro station in Fairfax County, Virginia, on the Silver Line. Located in Tysons, it began operation on July 26, 2014. The station is located in the central median of Leesburg Pike (SR 7) just west of Spring Hill Road.

There had been some controversy about whether to build the rail through Tysons below ground or on elevated tracks.

Station layout

Station facilities

2 station entrances (each side of SR 7)

History
This station reopened beginning on August 16, 2020, when trains were able to bypass East Falls Church station.

References

External links

Railway stations in the United States opened in 2014
Stations on the Silver Line (Washington Metro)
Transportation in Fairfax County, Virginia
Washington Metro stations in Virginia
2014 establishments in Virginia
Tysons, Virginia